is a Japanese television personality, actor, artist, and former professional boxer. For his role in the 1988 film The Discarnates, he won the award for best supporting actor at the 31st Blue Ribbon Awards, at the 13th Hochi Film Award, and at the 10th Yokohama Film Festival.

Filmography

Film
The Discarnates (1988) - Hidekichi Harada
Zatoichi (1989) - Tsuru
Sharaku (1995) - Goro
Sada (1998) - Tatsuzo Kikumoto
Last Love (2007)
Maniac Hero (2016) - Kōzō Kusaka
Labyrinth of Cinema (2020) - Sen no Rikyū
Haru ni Chiru (2023)

Television
Rose Against the Odds (1991) - Fighting Harada
Taiheiki (1991) - Hōjō Takatoki
Shūchakueki Series 5～ (1996–) – Masanao Ushio
Atsuhime (2008) - Iwakura Tomomi
Gunshi Kanbei (2014) - Kodera Masamoto
Kamen Rider Drive (2014) - Jun Honganji
Toto Neechan (2016) - Eitarō Kumai
Dokonimo nai Kuni (2018) - Ayao Kishimoto
Awaiting Kirin (2020) - Settsu Harukado
Chimudondon (2022) - Saburō Taira

Awards

|-
| rowspan="3"|1988
| rowspan="3"|The Discarnates
| 31st Blue Ribbon Awards: Best supporting actor
| 
|-
| 13th Hochi Film Award: Best supporting actor
| 
|-
| 10th Yokohama Film Festival: Best supporting actor
| 
|}

References

External links
  
 

1954 births
Japanese male actors
Living people
People from Tokyo
Academic staff of Aomori University